Glossopdale School is a mixed secondary school and sixth form located in Hadfield, Derbyshire, England.

History

The school used to be the Glossop Grammar School from the 1920s, being on Talbot Road since 1959, becoming Glossop Comprehensive School in 1965 when it merged with West End Secondary Modern (on Sunlaws Street and Chadwick Street and opened in 1913 as Glossop Independent Council School), and Castle School Secondary Modern in Hadfield. 

In 1989, the former Hadfield Comprehensive School on Newshaw Lane in Hadfield merged with the Glossop School to form the Glossopdale School. The Chadwick Street site is next to the St Philip Howard RC Academy (Glossop's other secondary school) on St Mary's Road.

As Glossopdale Community College, the school was awarded specialist Arts College status in September 2005, and also International Schools Status in July 2010. It is a member of the Peak 11 Learning Federation.

In 2017 Glossopdale Community College started to build a new purpose-built school on the playing fields of the Hadfield site. The new building would cater for all year groups and end the split site system that operated for nearly 3 decades. The school officially opened and started accepting pupils in 2018 and this coincided with a name change for the school to Glossopdale School.

The old school buildings in Hadfield have been demolished to create new playing fields for the new school. The buildings and land associated with the Glossop site (Talbot Road, Cemetery Road and Fauval Road) have been mothballed.

Previously a community school administered by Derbyshire County Council, in December 2020 Glossopdale School converted to academy status. The school is now sponsored by the True Learning Partnership.

Admissions
Until 2018, the school was spread over three sites; Hadfield, Glossop and Talbot House. The youngest students attended Hadfield site on Newshaw Lane, Hadfield. When the students moved into Year 9 they moved to Glossop Site on Talbot Road, Glossop. There was also a Sixth Form College in the historic 19th-century Talbot House, also on Talbot Road. In 2016 construction began on a new building on the Hadfield site, designed to merge all 3 previous sites into one building, which opened in 2018. The school was part of a successful pilot scheme, and subsequently offers C3 – a combined humanities curriculum – to Years 7 and 8. Glossopdale has also taken part in several teachers' television documentaries. Debbie McGloin was appointed as the headteacher in 2018, replacing Steven Playford.

In June 2018, the brand new school building was opened to students and to the public. The new building includes state-of-the-art facilities, from a community room to a large multi-use sports hall.

In 2022, Glossopdale saw the completion of the new Extension Building, a brand new building with eight classrooms over two floors, and a new multi-use sports ground. Since the extension was built, admission capacity increased by 35 students per year group.

In literature and popular culture

Music Department
Glossopdale Community College has a music department, which reflects the school's status as a Performing Arts College. It has a large selection of bands as well as the choirs. There is a Big Band, Wind Band, Brass Band, Samba Band, Flutz (a Flute ensemble) and Training Band.  During the 1970s and 1980s particularly, Glossop School Brass Band were an internationally renowned band, producing several LPs and touring Europe and the United States.

The Music Department takes part in a number of concert tours abroad, the most recent of which were in Paris, Salzburg, and Barcelona.

All the Small Things
Glossopdale Community College has a choir. Over the years, the choir has performed at festivals and won awards, and also made appearances on BBC television series All the Small Things in 2008.

Teachers TV
Glossopdale Community College has been the focus of a couple of TV documentaries for the now defunct government funded Teachers TV. A program titled Making Connections explores revolutionary teaching at the KS3 level.
A second program titled Special Needs, Inclusion takes an inside look at how Glossopdale Community College takes an active approach to helping students with additional and special education needs.

A Monster Calls
The 2016 film A Monster Calls includes scenes filmed in the now demolished Talbot Road site.

Academic performance
The school was given an overall effectiveness rating of 'Requires Improvement' in their most recent Ofsted inspection, which took place in March 2016.

In 2012, 58% of pupils gained 5 A*–C GCSE grades including English and Maths, a 20% improvement over 4 years.  87% of pupils achieved 5 A*–C grades. In 2016, the Progress 8 score for the school's GCSE results was -0.23; this is below the average Progress 8 for schools in England. The 2016 A-Level results had a progress score of -0.13, which is in line with the national average, and the average grade achieved was C.

Notable former pupils
 Peter Goodwright
 David Hargreaves (actor)
 Sydney Hope, Conservative MP from 1931 to 1935 for Stalybridge and Hyde
 James Hurst CBE, president in 1935 of the Institute of British Foundrymen (Institute of Cast Metals Engineers)
 Harold Fletcher (botanist), Regius Keeper of the Royal Botanic Garden Edinburgh from 1956 to 1970
 Prof Thomas Walker, professor of industrial biochemistry from 1956 to 1958 at the University of Manchester
 Dame Vivienne Westwood, fashion designer
Stuart Hall
Matt Taylor, music producer on Frank Turner album FTHC.<ref></
  Stephen Scott, Charles Vincent and Andrew (Jake) Higgs, formed post-punk band 'The Trend' in 1978 enjoying minor success in the UK singles chart after signing to MCA Records in 1979. "Polly and Wendy" MCA-583 (1980); "I Don't Anymore" MCA-613 (1980); "This Dance Hall Must Have A Back Way Out" MCA-629 (1980)

References

External links
 Official Glossopdale Website

Secondary schools in Derbyshire
Academies in Derbyshire
Glossop